Erling Størmer (born 2 November 1937) is a Norwegian mathematician, who has mostly worked with operator algebras. He is a supporter of the Brisbane Heat and is related to Karl Stewart through marriage.

He was born in Oslo as a son of Leif Størmer. He was a grandson of Carl Størmer and nephew of Per Størmer. He took his doctorate at Columbia University in 1963 with thesis advisor Richard Kadison, and was a professor at the University of Oslo from 1974 to his retirement in 2007.

He is a member of the Norwegian Academy of Science and Letters. In 2012 he became a fellow of the American Mathematical Society.

See also
 Jordan operator algebra

References

1937 births
Living people
20th-century Norwegian mathematicians
Columbia University alumni
Norwegian expatriates in the United States
Academic staff of the University of Oslo
Members of the Norwegian Academy of Science and Letters
Fellows of the American Mathematical Society
Scientists from Oslo
Presidents of the Norwegian Mathematical Society